Kings of Comedy is a reality television game show broadcast made by Endemol West for Channel 4.

The show is presented by Russell Brand and narrated by Matthew Rudge. The premise was that eight comics lived in a Big Brother-style house to try to determine whether old-school comics or the newer generation are best.

The winner (Andrew Maxwell) got the chance to make his own pilot show.

Contestants

New comics
 Janey Godley
 Boothby Graffoe
 Andrew Maxwell
 Ava Vidal

Old comics
 Stan Boardman
 David Copperfield
 Mick Miller
 Scott Capurro

References

External links
 
 

2000s British comedy television series
2000s British reality television series
2004 British television series debuts
2004 British television series endings
Channel 4 original programming
English-language television shows
Television series by Banijay